The Johannesburg South Africa Temple is the 36th operating temple of the Church of Jesus Christ of Latter-day Saints (LDS Church).

History
In April 1981, LDS Church leaders announced the building of a temple in Parktown, Johannesburg, South Africa. Groundbreaking took place on 27 November 1982. Once the site of estates built by nineteenth-century mining magnates and financiers, the area around the temple now features hospitals, office buildings, and schools, many of which are housed in mansions from the Victorian era.

The temple is visible from many parts of the city with its six spires reaching into the sky. The edges of the building are finished with tiered layers of face brick. A gray slate roof and indigenous quartzite for the temple's perimeter walls and entrance archways are designed to fit in with the historic buildings nearby.

Gordon B. Hinckley dedicated the temple on 24 August 1985. Although additional temples have been announced in Durban, South Africa and the Democratic Republic of the Congo, the Johannesburg temple currently serves church members from the Republic of Congo, the Democratic Republic of the Congo, South Africa, Zimbabwe, Kenya, Uganda, Mozambique, Tanzania, Zambia, and Madagascar.

In 2020, the Johannesburg South Africa Temple was closed in response to the coronavirus pandemic.

See also

 Comparison of temples of The Church of Jesus Christ of Latter-day Saints
 List of temples of The Church of Jesus Christ of Latter-day Saints
 List of temples of The Church of Jesus Christ of Latter-day Saints by geographic region
 Temple architecture (LDS Church)
 The Church of Jesus Christ of Latter-day Saints in South Africa

References

External links
Johannesburg South Africa Temple Official site
Johannesburg South Africa Temple at ChurchofJesusChristTemples.org

20th-century Latter Day Saint temples
Religious buildings and structures in Johannesburg
Christianity in Johannesburg
Religious buildings and structures completed in 1985
Temples (LDS Church) in Africa
Temples in South Africa
The Church of Jesus Christ of Latter-day Saints in South Africa
1985 establishments in South Africa
20th-century religious buildings and structures in South Africa